Alain Gafner is a Swiss orienteering competitor. He participated at the 1985 World Orienteering Championships in Bendigo, where he won a bronze medal in the relay, together with Willi Müller, Urs Flühmann and Martin Howald.

References

Year of birth missing (living people)
Living people
Swiss orienteers
Male orienteers
Foot orienteers
World Orienteering Championships medalists